"Out for Blood" is a song by Canadian rock band Sum 41, written by Deryck Whibley and Mike Green. It was released as the lead single from the album Order in Decline on April 24, 2019.

Music video
A music video, directed by Lee Levin, was released alongside the song.

It shows several people in different situations where someone frustrates them; like pouring coffee, walking through a just cleaned floor, and rejecting served food. After the first chorus, they all lash out in anger. During the guitar solo, all of them meet in the space where the band is performing and party, with them all having blood on their faces by the end.

Charts

Release history

References

External links

2019 singles
2019 songs
Sum 41 songs
Songs written by Deryck Whibley